Alpujarra is a town and municipality in the Tolima department of Colombia.

Municipalities of Tolima Department